The Common Security and Defence Policy Service Medal (named the European Security and Defence Policy Service Medal prior to 2009) is an international military decoration awarded to individuals, both military and civilian, who have served with CSDP missions. Since the 1990s the European Union has taken a greater role in military missions both in Europe and abroad. These actions were taken under the Common Security and Defence Policy (CSDP), which is implemented by the European Union Military Staff, a department of the EU. To recognize service in these missions the EU authorized the creation of a medal with a common obverse and reverse, to which clasps featuring the missions' name are attached to the ribbon bar.

Appearance
The medal is 36 mm in diameter, made of a silver colored metal. All versions share a common design. The obverse of the medal is plain except for a circle of twelve five pointed stars around the outside edge of the medal. The reverse contains the Latin phrase, Pro Pace Unum, meaning "United for Peace". The words are arranged in three lines one word above the other in the center of the medal. The medal is suspended from a 36 mm ribbon in EU blue with either a wide gold center stripe for headquarters and combat forces, or a wide white stripe for planning and support. Each operation is identified with a different clasp with the name of the operation worn on the ribbon of the medal. A miniature version is worn on the ribbon bar, when medals are not worn.

Ribbons and clasps

 Police Mission in Bosnia and Herzegovina (EUPM), 1 January 2003 – 
 EUFOR Concordia, 31 March 2003 – 15 December 2003
 Operation Artemis, 12 June 2003 – 1 September 2003
 EUPOL Proxima in the former Yugoslav Republic of Macedonia, 15 December 2003 – 14 December 2005
 EUFOR Althea, 2 December 2004 – 
 Reform Mission in the Democratic Republic of the Congo (EUSEC RD Congo), 8 June 2005 – 2016
 AMIS EU Supporting Action, 18 July 2005 – 31 December 2007
 Border Assistance Mission for the Rafah Crossing Point (EUBAM Rafah), 25 November 2005 – 
 Coordinating Office for Palestinian Police Support (EUPOL COPPS), 1 January 2006 – 
 EUFOR RD Congo, 12 June 2006 – 30 November 2006
 Police Mission to Afghanistan (EUPOL Afghanistan), 15 June 2007 – 31 December 2016
 Bridging Operation in Chad and the Central African Republic (EUFOR Tchad/RCA), 17 March 2008 – 15 March 2009
 European Union Monitoring Mission in Georgia (EUMM Georgia), October 2008 – 
 EU Naval Operation Atalanta, 5 November 2008 – 
 EU operations in Kosovo (including combined EU Election Observation Missions, European Commission and some early EULEX Kosovo awards), 9 December 2008 – 
 Rule of Law Mission in Kosovo (EULEX Kosovo), 9 December 2008 – 
  European Union Somalia Training Mission (EUTM Somalia), in Uganda, May 2010 – 
 European Union Regional Maritime Capacity Building for the Horn of Africa and the Western Indian Ocean (EUCAP NESTOR), 16 July 2012  – 
 EUTM Mali, January 2013 – 
 European Union Aviation Security Mission in South Sudan (EUAVSEC SOUTH SUDAN), February 2013 – January 2014
 EUFOR RCA, April 2014 – 2015
 EUAM Ukraine, December 2014 – present
 EUMAM RCA, March 2015 – July 2016
 EUNAVFOR Med - Operation Sophia, April 2015 – March 2020
 EUTM-RCA, July 2016  – 
 EUAM-Iraq, October 2017 – present
 EUNAVFOR Med - Operation Irini, March 2020 – present

Precedence
Some orders of precedence are as follows:

See also
European Community Monitor Mission Medal
Western European Union Mission Service Medal
International decoration

References

External links

Orders, decorations, and medals of the European Union
Campaign medals
Awards established in 2003